WABO (990 kHz, "Waybo Radio") is an AM radio station licensed to serve Waynesboro, Mississippi.  The station is owned by Martin Broadcasting Company.  It airs a variety hits format, simulcasting WABO-FM 105.5 Waynesboro.

The station has been assigned these call letters by the Federal Communications Commission since it was initially licensed.

References

External links

ABO
Adult hits radio stations in the United States